Abdoul Sakirou Bila (born 6 November 1992) is a Burkinabé professional footballer who plays as a forward for CS Sedan Ardennes.

Club career
Bila began his footballing career in his native Burkina Faso with 9 Athlétic Football Club. He moved to France to continue his footballing career, and played for various teams in the lower divisions of France.

On 17 July 2018, Bila moved to the reserve side of FC Lorient. He made his professional debut for Lorient in a 1–0 Coupe de la Ligue win over Valenciennes FC on 14 August 2018.

In August 2019, Bila joined Lyon-Duchère.

References

External links
 
 FCL Profile

1992 births
Living people
Sportspeople from Ouagadougou
Burkinabé footballers
Association football forwards
JA Drancy players
CS Sedan Ardennes players
FC Lorient players
Lyon La Duchère players
Ligue 2 players
Championnat National players
Championnat National 2 players
Championnat National 3 players
Burkinabé expatriate footballers
Burkinabé expatriate sportspeople in France
Expatriate footballers in France
21st-century Burkinabé people